Jaamamõisa (Estonian for "Station Manor") is a neighbourhood of Tartu, Estonia.

References

Tartu